Stanley Brian de Courcy-Ireland (1900–2001) was an officer in the Royal Navy, starting as a midshipman at the age of 13 and retiring as Deputy Director of Naval Equipment in 1951.

During the First World War, he served in the battle of Jutland, survived a torpedo attack by a U-boat and saw the scuttling of the German fleet in Scapa Flow.  In the interwar period, he joined the Fleet Air Arm and served as an observer.  During the Second World War, he saw action on HMS Newcastle in the Atlantic and Mediterranean.  He then returned to naval aviation, commanding an air station, coordinating air and naval action and then serving as Director of Combined Operations for the invasion of Europe.  Post-war, he commanded HMS Ajax in the Mediterranean, seeing action in the Balkans and the blockade of Palestine.

Legacy
His recollection of action in the First World War is preserved as an oral history in the Imperial War Museum.

DeCourcy Ireland Circle in Ajax, Ontario is named after him.

References

1900 births
2001 deaths
Royal Navy officers of World War I
Royal Navy officers of World War II
Alumni of Gonville and Caius College, Cambridge
Fleet Air Arm aviators
Deputy Directors of the Royal Navy
British military personnel of the Palestine Emergency
Captains of the Royal Navy
Men centenarians